Raye may refer to:

Raye (singer) (born 1997), British singer and songwriter
Raye, English dub name of anime character Sailor Mars

Given name
Raye Hartmann (born 1990), Canadian footballer
Raye Birk (born 1943), American film and television actor
Raye Hollitt (born 1964), American actress and female bodybuilder
Raye Montague (1935-2018), United States Naval Engineer
Raye Renfro (born 1940), American football and track and field athlete

Surname
Abigail Raye (born 1991), Canadian field hockey player
Benjamin Raye, American singer-songwriter
Carol Raye (1923–2022), British-born Australian singer and dancer 
Collin Raye (born 1960), American country music singer
Don Raye (1909–1985), American vaudevillian and songwriter
, British karateka at 1983 European Karate Championships
Jimmy Raye II (born 1946), American football coach
Jimmy Raye III, vice president of football operations for the Indianapolis Colts
 (1698–1737), Dutch governor of Surinam, husband of Charlotta Elisabeth van der Lith
Julianna Raye, American songwriter
Kevin Raye (born 1961), American politician
Kimberly Raye, American author who writes mostly romance and paranormal fiction
Martha Raye (1916–1994), American comic actress and singer
Sol Raye (1946–2006), Guyanese cabaret singer 
Susan Raye, singer-pianist and host of The Susan Raye Show, 1950 American television show
Susan Raye (born 1944), American country music singer
 (born 1937), French singer, Rock-A-Beatin' Boogie

See also
 Ray (disambiguation)
Raye-sur-Authie commune in the Pas-de-Calais department in the Hauts-de-France region of France
La Raye, or Anse La Raye town in Anse la Raye Quarter, Saint Lucia
Déversion de la Raye weir for water release from the Canal du Midi west of the Orbiel Aqueduct and northwest of Trèbes
Vievy-le-Rayé commune in the Loir-et-Cher department in central France
Club RaYé, cocktail bar and jazz club in Paris, France